Thomas Moores (1 July 1903 – 15 July 1983) was a member of the Queensland Legislative Assembly.

Biography
Moores was born in Gympie, Queensland, the son of John Thomas Moores and his wife Lucy (née Robinson). He was educated at One Mile State School in Gympie and then attended Brisbane Industrial High School. He worked as a manual training teacher at West End, South Brisbane and Dutton Park Opportunity state schools. In 1935-36 he went to England where he worked as a plumber and then served in the Australian Army from 1942 to 1945.

On 2 September 1944 Moores married Monica Annie Lovelock and together had one daughter. He died in Brisbane in July 1983.

Public career
Moores was the alderman for the Kurilpa ward in the Brisbane City Council from 1939 until 1949. When the member for the state seat of Kurilpa in the Queensland Legislative Assembly, Kerry Copley, died in 1949, Moores won the by-election and went on to represent the seat until 1957. He was one of the members of the Labor Party to defect to the newly formed Queensland Labor Party in 1957. As a member of the QLP he was appointed to the role of Minister for Transport in May of that year but lost his seat three months later.

He was president of the Plumbers Union in the early 1930s and a member of the Queensland Rugby League Committee being a keen supporter of the Souths Rugby League Club.

References

Members of the Queensland Legislative Assembly
1903 births
1983 deaths
Australian Labor Party members of the Parliament of Queensland
20th-century Australian politicians
Australian Army personnel of World War II